The Space Within US is a live DVD by Paul McCartney, released in November 2006. It is composed of footage taken during his fall 2005 'US' Tour in the United States in conjunction with his Chaos and Creation in the Backyard album release, though some of his Beatles songs and songs from his previous albums are also performed. A Blu-ray version was released on 18 November 2008. It reached number 3 in the US video charts.

Chapter listing
 "Intro"
 "Magical Mystery Tour"
 "Flaming Pie"
 "Let Me Roll It" / "Foxy Lady"
 "Drive My Car"
 "Till There Was You"
 "I'll Get You"
 "Eleanor Rigby"
 "Maybe I'm Amazed"
 "Got to Get You into My Life"
 "Fine Line"
 "I Will"
 "I'll Follow the Sun"
 "Good Day Sunshine"
 "For No One"
 "Hey Jude" (fragment)
 "Fixing a Hole"
 "Penny Lane"
 "Too Many People" / "She Came in Through the Bathroom Window"
 "Let It Be"
 "English Tea"
 Played live as a "wake-up" call to the crew of the International Space Station nearing the end of the Anaheim, California concert on 12 November 2005 (13 November on the east coast of the United States).
 "I've Got a Feeling"
 "Follow Me"
 "Jenny Wren"
 "Helter Skelter"
 "Yesterday"
 "Get Back"
 "Please Please Me"
 "Credits"

Extra features
 Sound check songs "Whole Lotta Shakin' Goin' On", "Friends to Go", and "How Kind of You"
 More About US – Interviews with Paul McCartney, the band, and the US tour crew
 US tour pre-show film
 On the Road With US
 Liner notes introduction by Cameron Crowe
 Song selection

Awards
Cinema Audio Society, USA: 2007 C.A.S. Award
Winner: Outstanding Achievement in Sound Mixing for Television – Non-Fiction, Variety or Music – Series or Specials
Matt Foglia (re-recording mixer); David Kahne (music mixer)

Charts

Certifications

References

Paul McCartney video albums
Albums produced by David Kahne
2006 live albums
2006 video albums
Live video albums
Paul McCartney live albums